"Hillbilly Girl with the Blues" is a song written and recorded by American country music artist Lacy J. Dalton.  It was released in December 1980 as the second single from the album  Hard Times.  The song reached number 8 on the Billboard Hot Country Singles & Tracks chart.

Chart performance

References

1981 singles
Lacy J. Dalton songs
Song recordings produced by Billy Sherrill
Columbia Records singles
1980 songs
Songs written by Lacy J. Dalton